Benjamin F. Dudley (born October 19, 1969) is an American politician from Maine. Dudley, a Democrat, represented the Munjoy Hill neighborhood of Portland, Maine in the Maine House of Representatives from 1998 to 2006.

Dudley graduated from the University of Southern Maine in 1999.

Dudley was Chellie Pingree's political director during the 2002 U.S. Senate election. Pingree lost to incumbent Susan Collins with 41% of the vote.

References

1969 births
Living people
Politicians from Portland, Maine
Democratic Party members of the Maine House of Representatives
University of Southern Maine alumni